HD 199942 is a binary star system in the northern constellation of Equuleus. It is faintly visible to the naked eye with an apparent visual magnitude of 5.98. The system is located at a distance of approximately 184 light years based on parallax, and it has an absolute magnitude of 1.59. It is drifting closer with a radial velocity of −26 km/s.

This system is moving through the galaxy at a velocity of  relative to the Sun.

The pair orbit each other with a period of 58.4 years and an eccentricity of 0.295. The primary component is of visual magnitude 6.23 and is a chemically-peculiar F-type main-sequence star with a class of F1Vp. The companion is of magnitude 8.13.

References

F-type main-sequence stars
Ap stars
Binary stars
Equuleus
Durchmusterung objects
Equulei, 5
199942
103652
8038